MBC 2 is a television channel of the Mauritius Broadcasting Corporation (MBC) broadcast in Mauritius. It was launched as the second TV channel in Mauritius on 30 July 1990 after the MBC 1. The channel broadcasts shows and movies related to major languages that are spoken in Mauritius such as Hindi, Tamil, Telugu, Marathi and Mandarin, among others.

Programming

Block Programme
Samachar 
Zournal

Fictional Serial Broadcast

English
 Santa Diabla

Hindi
CID
Piya Rangrezz
Saat Phere
Bahu Hamari Rajni Kant
Mahabharat
Santoshi Maa

Tamil
 Thiru Mangalyam
 Lakshmi Vanthachu
 Deepangal
 Shenbagam
 Masala Kudumpam
 Siva Ragasiyam

See also
 Kids Channel (Mauritian TV channel)
 List of television channels in Mauritius
 Media of Mauritius
 List of Shows Broadcast by the Mauritius Broadcasting Corporation

References

1990 establishments in Mauritius
Television channels and stations established in 1990
Television channels in Mauritius
Mauritius Broadcasting Corporation